Rhythm Rodeo is an American television series which aired on the DuMont Television Network from August 6, 1950, to January 7, 1951. Each 30-minute episode was broadcast live. Despite its name, it featured many different types of popular music, although the original premise of the show was to showcase country and western music.

The series starred noted singer Art Jarrett, and also featured Paula Wray and the Star Noters. The writer was Loring Mandel. The series aired on Sunday nights at 8 pm EST opposite the popular The Ed Sullivan Show on CBS and The Colgate Comedy Hour on NBC, and was cancelled after the January 7 broadcast.

Episode status
As with most DuMont series, no episodes of this show are known to survive today.

See also
List of programs broadcast by the DuMont Television Network
List of surviving DuMont Television Network broadcasts
1950-51 United States network television schedule

References

Bibliography
David Weinstein, The Forgotten Network: DuMont and the Birth of American Television (Philadelphia: Temple University Press, 2004) 
Alex McNeil, Total Television, Fourth edition (New York: Penguin Books, 1980) 
Tim Brooks and Earle Marsh, The Complete Directory to Prime Time Network TV Shows, Third edition (New York: Ballantine Books, 1964)

External links

DuMont historical website

1950s American variety television series
1950 American television series debuts
1951 American television series endings
Black-and-white American television shows
DuMont Television Network original programming
Lost television shows